Ech-Chaab (in Arabic الشعب meaning The people) is a daily newspaper in Algeria published six days a week in the tabloid format. It is one of the most widely read newspapers in Algeria.

History and profile
Ech-Chaab is an Algerian general daily newspaper appearing in Arabic which was founded on December 11, 1962, a few months after the Algerian independence.

This journalistic title is currently one of the six dailies of the Algerian public press.

Journalist Mustapha Hemissi was appointed head of the newspaper on May 31, 2020, succeeding Fnides Ben Bella.

Notable journalists
 Othmane Senadjki (1959-2010)

See also
 List of newspapers in Algeria

External links
 Ech-Chaab Official website

References

1962 establishments in Algeria
Newspapers published in Algeria
Arabic-language newspapers
Publications established in 1962
Mass media in Algiers